Kordon is a village in Ga-Matlala in the Polokwane Local Municipality of the Capricorn District Municipality of the Limpopo province of South Africa. It is located 47 km northwest of Polokwane on the Matlala Road.

Education 
 Tau-Kwena Primary School.

References 

Populated places in the Polokwane Local Municipality